João Victor Cubas Alves (born 21 November 2000) is a Brazilian footballer who plays as a central defender for Maringá.

Club career
Born in Avaré, São Paulo, Cubas joined XV de Jaú in 2016, from São Carlos. He made his first team debut for the former on 29 April 2018, starting in a 1–0 Campeonato Paulista Segunda Divisão home win against Independente de Limeira.

Subsequently, Cubas moved to América Mineiro and returned to youth football, being assigned to the under-20 squad. He made his debut with the main squad of Coelho on 13 October 2019, playing the full 90 minutes and scoring his team's only in a 2–1 away loss against Figueirense, for the Série B championship.

On 2 September 2020, after only one further appearance for América, Cubas joined Santos and was initially assigned to the B-team.

Career statistics

References

External links

2000 births
Living people
Footballers from São Paulo (state)
Brazilian footballers
Association football defenders
Campeonato Brasileiro Série B players
Esporte Clube XV de Novembro (Jaú) players
América Futebol Clube (MG) players
Santos FC players
Tupynambás Futebol Clube players
Maringá Futebol Clube players
People from Avaré